The Asia Winter Baseball League is a professional baseball league hosted in Taiwan with 2012 as its inaugural season. Making use of the warm and dry winter climate in West Taiwan, the short term league aims to offer young baseball players additional training experience and continued exposure in off-season games. It is the de facto successor to the now defunct Asia Series.

Seasons

2012 
Season 2012 was played between Japan, Taiwan Red, Taiwan White, and the Dominican Republic, with Japan winning the championship.

2013 
Season 2013 was played between the teams of Nippon Professional Baseball League, Korea Baseball Organization, Chinese Professional Baseball League of Taiwan, and the Dominican Republic. Japan won the league phase but lost the playoff final to South Korea.

2015 
Season 2015 was played between the teams of Nippon Professional Baseball League, Korea Baseball Organization, Chinese Professional Baseball League of Taiwan, the Chinese Taipei National Training Team, and the Team Europe. This was the first time since the Asia Winter Baseball League was founded that Team Europe was invited. Team Europe consisted of total 30 players from different countries (12 Italians, 8 Dutch, 3 German, 2 French, 1 Czech, 1 Belgian, 1 Croat, 1 Hispanic and 1 Romanian). The Chinese Taipei National Training Team won the championship with team Japan as runner-up.

2016 
Season 2016 was played between the 2 teams of Nippon Professional Baseball League (East Japan/West Japan), Korea Baseball Organization Team, Chinese Professional Baseball League Team of Taiwan, Chinese Taipei National Training Team, and the Team Europe. The final was played between the 2 Japanese teams. The West Japan team consisting of players from  Nippon Professional Baseball League teams from West Japan won the championship.

2017 
Season 2017 was played between the 2 teams of Nippon Professional Baseball League (East Japan/West Japan), Korea Baseball Organization Team, Chinese Professional Baseball League Team of Taiwan, the Japan Amateur Baseball Association All Star Team, and the WBSC All Star team managed by WBSC consisting of Team Europe players augmented with additional U.S. players. Experiencing player shortages due to injuries and early departures of team members, WBSC team took on amateur baseball players from Japan and Taiwan as replacements. The East Japan team consisting of players from  Nippon Professional Baseball League teams from East Japan won the championship.

2018 
Season 2018 was played by 5 teams, 2 teams of Nippon Professional Baseball League (East Japan/West Japan), one Korea Baseball Organization Team, one Chinese Professional Baseball League  of Taiwan team, the Japan Amateur Baseball Association All Star Team. 40 regular season games were played November 24 - December 13, 2018. Each team was playing 16 games, top four teams played three more games in playoffs December 14–16, 2018. All games were played at either Taichung Intercontinental Baseball Stadium or Douliu Baseball Stadium

NPB West missed the Playoffs. KBO finished in fourth place, JABA team in third place, CPBL in second place, NPB East winners.

2019 
The CPBL Expansion team Wei Chuan Dragons have expressed their willingness to send a team. source: CPBL Stats

Previous Results

All-time Table (Excluding playoffs)

See also
Asia Series
Chinese Professional Baseball League (Taiwan)
Taiwan baseball team
Professional baseball in Taiwan
Chinese Professional Baseball League (CPBL) awards

References 

3. 2018 Schedule and info from CPBL in Chinese Retrieved October 20, 2018
4. Roster of the AWB 2018 NPB teams by Yakyu Database Retrieved October 20, 2018
5. 2018 AWB Rosters Retrieved November 20, 2018
6. Day One of 2018 at CPBL website Retrieved November 24, 2018

2012 establishments in Taiwan
Baseball leagues in Asia
Sports leagues established in 2012
Professional sports leagues in Taiwan
Professional sports leagues in Japan
Professional sports leagues in South Korea
Multi-national professional sports leagues
Winter baseball leagues